The Wyoming Marathon Races are a series of running races held annually in Medicine Bow National Forest between Laramie and Cheyenne, Wyoming.

Events

 Vedauwoo 5K 
 Medicine Bow Half Marathon
 Wyoming Marathon
 Rocky Mountain Double Marathon

The course for the half marathon, marathon, and double marathon all start at the Lincoln Monument Rest Area off I-80. The course is an out-and-back through the roads of Medicine Bow National Forest, starting at an elevation of 8,700 ft. and dropping to 8,000 ft. at the lowest point of the marathon and double marathon course. Runners competing in the double marathon run the full marathon course twice (two out-and-backs), covering 52.4 miles total.

The Wyoming Marathon is the oldest marathon in the state and the Rocky Mountain Double Marathon is the oldest ultramarathon in the Rocky Mountain region. It is one of only three marathons in the state of Wyoming, in addition to the Casper Marathon and the Run with the Horses Marathon in Green River.

Rocky Mountain Double Marathon Winners

Wyoming Marathon Winners

External links
Official website
Wyoming Marathon at marathonguide.com

Marathons in the United States
Sports in Wyoming
Tourist attractions in Albany County, Wyoming
Tourist attractions in Laramie County, Wyoming
Sports competitions in Wyoming